A sensor node, also known as a mote (chiefly in North America), is a node in a sensor network that is capable of performing some processing, gathering sensory information and communicating with other connected nodes in the network. A mote is a node but a node is not always a mote.

List of Wireless Sensor Nodes

See also
 Wireless sensor network
 Sensor node
 Mesh networking
 Sun SPOT
 Embedded computer
 Embedded system
 Mobile ad hoc network (MANETS)
 Smartdust
 Sensor Web

References

Wireless sensor network
Computer networking
 
Embedded systems
Wireless sensor nodes